Polanco metro station is a station of the Mexico City Metro in Miguel Hidalgo, Mexico City. It is an underground station with two side platforms served by Line 7 (the Orange Line) between San Joaquín and Auditorio metro stations. It serves the colonia (neighborhood) of Polanco and it is named after it; the pictogram depicts the clock tower located at the nearby Lincoln Park. Polanco station opened on 20 December 1984 with service northward toward Tacuba station and southward toward Auditorio station. In 2019, the station had an average daily ridership of 35,694 passengers, making it the 24th busiest station in the network and the third busiest of the line.

The station is one of the deepest on the network and the facilities are partially accessible for people with disabilities as there are elevators. Along with escalators, commuters can use the staircases, including one set that is a giant piano-shaped staircase. The steps are fully interactive as they include motion sensors that produce key sounds whenever their laser detects movement.

Location and layout
Polanco is a metro station located along Horacio Avenue, in Miguel Hidalgo, Mexico City. The station serves the affluent colonia (Mexican Spanish for "neighborhood") of Polanco, benefiting visitors of American Park, Uruguay Square and Presidente Masaryk Avenue, one of the most expensive shopping districts in the country. Within the system, the station lies between San Joaquín and Auditorio stations. It has a partially disabled-accessible service with escalators. These were renovated in 2018 due to their obsolescence.

There are two exits: the west one on the corner of Horacio Avenue and Temístocles Street and the second on the opposite side of Horacio Avenue, on the corner of Arquímedes Street. The area is the most expensive to live in near a metro station as the average  costs around Mex$94,800 (around US$4,700) as of 2019. The area is serviced by Route 13-D of the city's public bus system and by the Ecobici network.

Landmarks

In collaboration with the National Polytechnic Institute, authorities of the system decorated the staircase that connects the platforms with the next level to look like a piano. It is composed of 54 steps divided into three sections (that is, it has two landings). The white steps are made of white marble, while the black ones are of black granite. Each white step has a motion sensor that produces a key sound when activated; steps with black keys have two sensors allowing users to produce accidental notes. The inferior part produces low tones while the upper part high tones. It was decided to put laser sensors and not contact sensors due to high ridership. Their service life is five years but it can be extended with appropriate maintenance. The decoration was placed in 2014 to promote the physical stimulation of people.

Inside the station's lobby, there are four cultural showcases. In 2017, the station was selected to be "emblematic" in order to promote UNESCO's past and future programs in Mexico. The selection was part of the 50th anniversary of operations in the country.

History and construction
Line 7 of the Mexico City Metro was built by Cometro, a subsidiary of Empresas ICA. Its first section opened on 20 December 1984, operating from Tacuba to Auditorio stations. The station's pictogram features the silhouette of the clock tower found in nearby Lincoln Park. The station was named after the neighborhood which in turn was named after a river that runs in the zone. Unofficially, the river was named after Juan Alfonso de Polanco, a Spanish Jesuit priest.

The station is one of the deepest on the network; the staircases compose around 110 steps.

Incidents
On 16 October 2019, the escalators suddenly stopped, causing four commuters to fall from them, including an 82-year-old man; three of them were taken to a hospital but none of them presented serious injuries. Investigations indicated that two men started a fight on the escalators and, at some point, they provoked the stoppage. After they caused it, both escaped.

On 15 January 2023, two cars separated when the train arrived at the station. Witnesses reported an explosion and subsequent smoke coming out of the affected area; no injuries were reported. The explosion occurred during a period when the Mexico City government was alleging that the transport system was in a state of potential sabotage attacks and "atypical incidents" supposedly perpetrated by the opposition to the Fourth Transformation, the political platform of the president Andrés Manuel López Obrador, following the 2023 Mexico City Metro train crash. Guillermo Calderón, director of the Mexico City Metro system, reported that a loosened bolt and a disgorged bolt caused a safety cylinder to break and separate the cars and denied that it was a maintenance problem as the train had been overhauled days before the event.

Ridership
According to the data provided by the authorities since the 2000s, commuters have averaged per year between 14,700 and 35,700 daily entrances in the last decade. In 2019, before the impact of the COVID-19 pandemic on public transport, the station's ridership totaled 13,028,555 passengers, which was an increase of 626,303 passengers compared to 2018. In the same year, Polanco was the 24th busiest station of the system's 195 stations, and it was the line's 3rd busiest.

Gallery

Notes

References

External links
 
 

1984 establishments in Mexico
Accessible Mexico City Metro stations
Mexico City Metro Line 7 stations
Mexico City Metro stations in Miguel Hidalgo, Mexico City
Polanco, Mexico City
Railway stations located underground in Mexico
Railway stations opened in 1984